Sanajay Vyas (born 14 October 1961) is an Indian first-class cricketer who represented Rajasthan. He made his first-class debut for Rajasthan in the 1979-80 Ranji Trophy on 14 March 1980.

References

External links
 

1961 births
Living people
Indian cricketers
Rajasthan cricketers